Wenche Kvamme (19 June 1950 – 9 March 2019) was a Norwegian singer and actress.

Career
Kvamme was born in Bergen, and was educated at the Norwegian National Academy of Theatre.

She made her stage début at Nationaltheatret in 1977, in an adaptation of Georg Büchner's play Danton's Death. She was appointed at the Bergen theatre Den Nationale Scene in 1978, where she worked most of her career.

She died in Bergen on 9 March 2019, aged 68.

References

1950 births
2019 deaths
Actors from Bergen
20th-century Norwegian women singers
20th-century Norwegian singers
Norwegian actresses
21st-century Norwegian women singers
21st-century Norwegian singers